Staro Nagoričane Municipality is a municipality in the northern part of North Macedonia. The municipal seat is located in the village Staro Nagoričane. This municipality is part of the Northeastern Statistical Region.

Geography
The municipality borders Serbia to the north, Kumanovo Municipality to the west, Kratovo Municipality to the south, and Rankovce Municipality to the east. It largely corresponds to the historical and geographical region of Sredorek.

History and culture

By the 2003 territorial division of the republic, the rural Klečevce Municipality was attached to Staro Nagoričane Municipality.

A particularly fine example of medieval Serbian ecclesiastical architecture is found in the municipality, in the form of the 10th century Church of St. George. (See: Serbo-Byzantine style)

Demographics
According to the 2021 Macedonian census, this municipality has 3,501 inhabitants. There were 5,867 inhabitants in 1994. Ethnic groups in the municipality:

Inhabited places

Notable people
Denko Krstić (1824–1882), influential merchant, born in Mlado Nagoričane.
Petko Ilić (1886–1912), guerilla fighter, born in Staro Nagoričane.
Todor Krstić-Algunjski (d. after 1918), guerilla fighter, born in Algunja.
Ditko Aleksić (d. 1916), guerilla fighter, born in Osiče.
Timotej of Debar and Kichevo (b. 1951), orthodox mitropolitian, born in Mlado Nagoričane.

International relations

Staro Nagoričane is twinned with:
, Gornji Milanovac, Serbia.

References

External links 
 Official website]

 
Northeastern Statistical Region
Municipalities of North Macedonia